Crno Vrelo is a village in Croatia, under the Slunj township, in Karlovac County, Croatia.

References

Geography of Croatia
Populated places in Karlovac County